Brigadier-General Archibald Jack,  (1874 – 29 January 1939) was a New Zealand-born railway engineer and British Army officer.

Early life and career
Jack was educated at Otago Boys' High School and began his career in the New Zealand Department of Public Works in 1893. He was commissioned into the 9th Battalion, New Zealand Regiment on the outbreak of the Second Boer War and served in South Africa. The war over, he returned to civilian life, working for the Central South African Railways from 1902 to 1908, the Tientsin-Pakow Railway in China from 1909 to 1910, and on the railways of Argentina from 1911 to 1916.

First World War
In 1916 he sailed to Britain, was commissioned into the Royal Engineers in 1917 as a temporary lieutenant-colonel and served in Romania. In 1918 he was promoted colonel and was given command of the British Railway Mission on the Trans-Siberian Railway in Russia, responsible for co-ordinating the operation of the railway during the Russian Civil War. He was promoted to the temporary rank of brigadier-general in 1919. He was mentioned in dispatches three times and was appointed Commander of the Order of the British Empire (CBE) and Companion of the Order of St Michael and St George (CMG) in 1919, and Companion of the Order of the Bath (CB) in the Siberian War Honours of January 1920.

Later career and life
Following the war, Jack returned to civilian life as general manager of the United Railways of Havana, Cuba from 1920 until his retirement in 1925. On one occasion, he was shot through the head by a striker, but miraculously survived. He also survived being torpedoed three times during the war and was a survivor of the Sevenoaks railway disaster of 1927.

Footnotes

References
Obituary, The Times, 11 February 1939
Who Was Who
Military Personnel File online; digitised record for South African War at Archives New Zealand.

1874 births
1939 deaths
British Army brigadiers
British Army personnel of the Russian Civil War
British Army personnel of World War I
Companions of the Order of St Michael and St George
Companions of the Order of the Bath
Commanders of the Order of the British Empire
British railway civil engineers
New Zealand military personnel of the Second Boer War
New Zealand people in rail transport
People from Hokitika
Recipients of the Order of the Rising Sun, 3rd class
Royal Engineers officers
People educated at Otago Boys' High School
20th-century New Zealand engineers
British people in Transvaal Colony